Nuta or NUTA may refer to:

Nuta (name)
Mehed ei nuta (Men Don't Cry), a 1968 Estonian television comedy 
Msondo Ngoma (formerly NUTA Jazz Band), Tanzanian muziki wa dansi band